Following are the programs on the 1950–1951 United States network television weekday schedule, listing daytime Monday–Friday schedules on four networks for each calendar season from September 1950 to August 1951. All times are Eastern and Pacific.  This page is missing info on the DuMont Television Network, which started daytime transmission before any other United States television network.
Talk shows are highlighted in  yellow, local programming is white, reruns of prime-time programming are orange, game shows are pink, soap operas are chartreuse, news programs are gold and all others are light blue. New series are highlighted in bold.

Note: The DuMont Television Network still missing in the schedules. All Monday–Friday Shows for all networks beginning in September 1950.

Fall 1950

Winter 1950-1951

Spring 1951

Summer 1951

By network

ABC

Returning Series
Mr. Magic and J.J.

New Series
The Half-Pint Party
Hold'er Newt
Lois and Looie
The Mary Hartline Show
Ozmoe
Paddy the Pelican
Space Patrol
TV Tots Time

Not Returning From 1949-50

CBS

Returning Series
Action in the Afternoon
As the World Turns
The Big Payoff
The Bill Cullen Show
The Bob Crosby Show
Break the Bank
CBS Evening News
CBS News
The Chuck Wagon
The Edge of Night
The Egg and I
Face the Nation
Freedom Rings
The Guiding Light
Homemaker's Exchange
It's Fun to Know
Love of Life
The Mel Torme Show
Morning News
Search for Tomorrow
Two Sleepy People
The U.N. in Action
Vanity Fair

New Series
All Around the Town
The Betty Crocker Show
Bride and Groom
Fashion Magic
The First Hundred Years
The Garry Moore Show
Hold'er Newt
The Johnny Johnston Show
The Life with Snarky Parker
Look Your Best
Lucky Pup
Meet Your Cover Girl
Paddy the Pelican
Robert Q's Matinee
The Steve Allen Show
Strike It Rich
Winner Take All
The World Is Yours

Not Returning From 1949-50
Classifield Column
The Ted Steele Show
U.N. General Assembly Sessions

NBC

Returning Series
The Bill Cullen Show
Breakfast Party
Howdy Doody
Meet the Press
NBC News Update

New Series
America Speaks
The Bert Parks Show
Cowboy Playhouse
Hawkins Falls, Population 6200
The Kate Smith Hour
Miss Susan
The NBC Comics
Panhandle Pete and Jennifer
The Ransom Sherman Show
Remember this Date
The Straw Hat Matinee
Vacation Wonderland

Not Returning From 1949-50
Henson Baldwin's War News Digest
Judy Splinters

Dumont

Returning series
Okay, Mother
TV Shopper

See also
1950-51 United States network television schedule (prime-time)

Sources
https://web.archive.org/web/20071015122215/http://curtalliaume.com/abc_day.html
https://web.archive.org/web/20071015122235/http://curtalliaume.com/cbs_day.html
https://web.archive.org/web/20071012211242/http://curtalliaume.com/nbc_day.html

United States weekday network television schedules
1950 in American television
1951 in American television